Pinus parviflora, also known as five-needle pine, Ulleungdo white pine, or Japanese white pine, is a pine in the white pine group, Pinus subgenus Strobus, native to Korea and Japan.

It is a coniferous evergreen tree, growing to 15–25 m in height and is usually as broad as it is tall, forming a wide, dense, conical crown. The leaves are needle-like, in bundles of five, with a length of 5–6 cm. The cones are 4–7 cm long, with broad, rounded scales; the seeds are 8–11 mm long, with a vestigial 2–10 mm wing.

The Latin specific epithet parviflora means "with small flowers".

This is a popular tree for bonsai, and is also grown as an ornamental tree in parks and gardens.  The cultivars 'Adcock's Dwarf' and ‘Bonnie Bergman’ have gained the Royal Horticultural Society's Award of Garden Merit.

Gallery

References

Trees of Korea
Least concern plants
Ornamental trees
Parviflora
Plants used in bonsai
Trees of Japan
Taxa named by Joseph Gerhard Zuccarini